Black Bart is a 1948 American Western film directed by George Sherman and starring Yvonne De Carlo, Dan Duryea as the real-life cowboy bandit Charles Bolles, and Jeffrey Lynn. It was distributed by Universal-International and produced by Leonard Goldstein. It was shot in Technicolor and was also known as Black Bart, Highwayman. The film was written by Luci Ward, Jack Natteford, and William Bowers and was released on March 3, 1948.

Plot
From his jail cell, old-time outlaw Jersey Brady (Percy Kilbride) tells the story of his ex-partner, notorious highwayman Charles E. Boles, also known as Black Bart (Dan Duryea).

Years earlier, Charles, Lance Hardeen (Jeffrey Lynn), and Jersey are working as outlaws when Charles decides to leave the gang, move to California, and pull off one last, big heist, which will allow him to go straight. Although Lance tries to trick Charles out of his share of their hidden loot, Charles secretly double-crosses Lance first and steals all the money.

Months later in Sacramento, Charles meets an ex-partner Clark (John McIntire), who now uses his position as a lawyer to commit big crimes. Together, the two plan to destroy the local Wells Fargo bank, create their own bank in its place, and profit from the growing gold rush business. Over the next two months, Clark tips off Charles about all the Wells Fargo money shipments, and a disguised Charles robs each stage until the townspeople lose confidence in the bank.

One day, when a masked Charles, now known as Black Bart, stops a coach transporting Lance, Jersey, and the celebrated dancer Lola Montez (Yvonne De Carlo), Lance recognizes Charles' voice and helps to save the coach from his thievery. Lance then brings the coach to the bank's relay station, where he further impresses Lola by saving the broken leg of the driver. Soon after, however, Charles, as Black Bart, also intrigues Lola when he sneaks into the station, returns her diamond bracelet, and embraces her before fleeing.

The next day when they reach Sacramento, Wells Fargo manager Mark Lorimer and Sheriff Gordon (Lloyd Gough) hire Lance and Jersey, whom they consider their new heroes, as coach guards. Charles, a respected rancher by day, greets them in the local bar, and although Lance reveals that he knows Charles is Black Bart and tells him that he wants Lola, Charles insists they take out Lola together. One day, Charles gets Lola alone and the two fall in love, but after he admits he is Black Bart, she implores him to give up his criminal life to be with her, and he agrees to do so after just one last job.

Meanwhile, Sheriff Gordon devises a plan for Lance to act as lookout for a posse of deputies who are to guard a coach carrying the payload that will save Wells Fargo. As Lance and Jersey scheme to rob the stage themselves and blame it on Black Bart, Clark tells Charles that if the stage gets through, their plan will be ruined. Black Bart meets the stage, orders Jersey to throw the money box down as the stage rides past, and escapes from Lance. When he opens the box, however, he finds it empty and realizes the money must still be at the relay station.

That night, after Charles tells Lola he has to go back to retrieve the money, she convinces him to not take the risk. Charles then tells Lance that he can steal and keep all the money himself. Lance, however, forces Charles to go with him to the relay station, and as soon as they get there, they are ambushed by a waiting posse. They escape into a barn, but when the posse sets it on fire, they are forced to run out and both of them are shot.

Making a final statement about not knowing what happened to Lola after the incident, Jersey wraps up his story from his current home, a jail cell.

Main cast

 Yvonne De Carlo as Lola Montez
 Dan Duryea as Charles E. Boles AKA Black Bart
 Jeffrey Lynn as Lance Hardeen
 Percy Kilbride as Jersey Brady
 Lloyd Gough as Sheriff Gordon
 Frank Lovejoy as Mark Lorimer
 John McIntire as Clark
 Don Beddoe as J.T. Hall
 Ray Walker as MacFarland
 Soledad Jiménez as Teresa
 Eddy C. Waller as Ed Mason
 Anne O'Neal as Mrs. Harmon
 Chief Many Treaties as Indian
 Eddie Acuff as Elkins
 Earl Audet as Townsman
 William Bailey as Townsman
 Ray Bennett as Henry
 Nina Campana as Mamacita
 Tom Coleman as Wells Fargo Representative
 Russ Conway as Wells Fargo Agent Clayton
 Bert Davidson as Blake
 George Douglas as Alcott
 Franklyn Farnum as Al
 Douglas Fowley as Sheriff Mix
 Ray Harper as Townsman
 Reed Howes as Bartender
 Si Jenks as Tobacco-Chewing Barfly
 Jack Kenny as Townsman
 Milton Kibbee as Townsman
 Kenneth Ross MacKenzie as Townsman
 Paul Maxey as Townsman
 Frank O'Connor as Wells Fargo Executive
 William O'Leary as Wells Fargo Man
 Artie Ortego as Townsman
 Marshall Ruth as Bandleader
 Everett Shields as Keller
 George Sowards as Stage Driver
 Ray Teal as Pete
 Harry Tenbrook as Barfly
 Jack Tornek as Townsman
 Wayne C. Treadway as Townsman
 Henry Wills as Ambush Deputy

Production
The script was based on a real life bandit. Universal announced the film in June 1946 saying that Charles Korvin might be cast and the film would be called Black Bart – Highwayman.

When Universal merged with International Pictures, the project was shelved, but it was revived in January 1947 under the title The Adventures of Black Bart. Luci Ward and Jack Natteford, who had written Badman's Territory, were assigned to write the script. Paul Malvern was initially supposed to produce for the film but Leonard Goldstein eventually got the job, his first as producer. George Sherma signed to direct.

In April 1947 Universal announced the lead roles were to be played by Yvonne de Carlo, Dan Duryea, and Edmond O'Brien. In June O'Brien  dropped out to make Imagination (which became A Double Life) and was replaced by Jeffrey Lynn who had just finished his long-term career at Warners.

Parts of the film were shot in Kanab Canyon, Strawberry Valley, and Strawberry Point in Utah.

Reception
The film was popular at the box office.

Home media
The film is available on DVD in Europe, presented in PAL format where the film is sped-up slightly to fit this different format and has a runtime of 77 minutes. Most DVD-Rs of the movie made for North American purchasers use the same print from the PAL DVDs.

References

External links
 
 
 
 

1948 films
1948 Western (genre) films
1940s English-language films
Films directed by George Sherman
Films scored by Frank Skinner
Films scored by Leith Stevens
American Western (genre) films
Films shot in Utah
1940s American films